The Asian Indoor Games is a biennial event which began in 2005. The Olympic Council of Asia accepts only athletes who are representing one of the organisation's member states (most of which are within Asia) and recognises records set at editions of the Asian Indoor Games. The Games records in athletics are the best marks set in competitions at the Games.

Men

Women

See also
 List of Asian Games records in athletics
 List of Asian Indoor Athletics Championships records

References

Records
Asian Indoor Games
Asian Indoor Games athletics
Asian Indoor Games